Kaarlo Hannes Maaninka (born 25 December 1953) is a Finnish former long-distance runner who won a silver medal in the 10,000 metres and a bronze medal in the 5,000 metres at the 1980 Moscow Olympics. He later admitted that he had used blood transfusions at the 1980 Olympics, though this was not against the rules at that time.

Records 
 1 500 m: 3.46,80 (1980)
 3 000 m: 7.58,0 (1978)
 5 000 m: 13.22,00 (1980)
 10 000 m: 27.44,28 (1980)
 Marathon: 2.19,28 (1978)

References 

1953 births
Living people
People from Posio
Finnish male long-distance runners
Athletes (track and field) at the 1980 Summer Olympics
Olympic athletes of Finland
Olympic silver medalists for Finland
Olympic bronze medalists for Finland
Medalists at the 1980 Summer Olympics
Olympic silver medalists in athletics (track and field)
Olympic bronze medalists in athletics (track and field)
Sportspeople from Lapland (Finland)